Mordellistena rufifrons is a species of beetle in the genus Mordellistena of the family Mordellidae. It was described by Schilsky in 1894.

References

Beetles described in 1894
rufifrons